The Untouchables is an American crime drama series that aired for two seasons in syndication, from January 1993 to May 1994. The series portrayed work of the real life Untouchables federal investigative squad in Prohibition-era Chicago and its efforts against Al Capone's attempts to profit from the market in bootleg liquor.

The series features Tom Amandes as Eliot Ness and William Forsythe as Al Capone, and was based on the 1959 series and 1987 film of the same name.

Synopsis
Eliot Ness (Amandes), disgusted with the widespread criminality that Al Capone (Forsythe) has brought to his home town, Chicago, and inspired by the example of his brother-in-law, Alexander Jamie (Patrick Clear), a federal law enforcement officer, becomes a government investigator himself, and puts together a special squad specifically dedicated to putting Capone behind bars.

Cast and characters

Episodes

DVD releases
Visual Entertainment has released the complete series on DVD in Region 1 on December 27, 2016.

The Untouchables was also released on Blu-ray in 2017.

Soundtrack album
Dragon's Domain Records released a limited edition 2-CD set of Joel Goldsmith's work on the series in 2017, featuring the score from the two-hour pilot film and selections from the episodes "The Seduction of Eliot Ness," "A Man's Home Is His Castle," "Stir Crazy," "Railroaded," the two-parter "Cuba," "Attack on New York,"  "Mind Games," "The Legacy," "Stadt," "Til Death Do Us Part,"  and "Death and Taxes: Part 2."

References

Further reading
Tucker, Kenneth. Eliot Ness and the Untouchables: The Historical Reality and the Film and Television Depictions. Jefferson, North Carolina: McFarland & Company, 2000.

External links
 
 

1993 American television series debuts
1994 American television series endings
1990s American crime drama television series
Cultural depictions of Al Capone
Cultural depictions of Eliot Ness
English-language television shows
First-run syndicated television programs in the United States
Live action television shows based on films
Television series about organized crime
Television series by CBS Studios
Television series created by Christopher Crowe (screenwriter)
Television series reboots
Television series set in the 1930s
Television shows set in Chicago
The Untouchables
Works about the Chicago Outfit